The Cellini Salt Cellar (in Vienna called the Saliera, Italian for salt cellar) is a part-enamelled gold table sculpture by Benvenuto Cellini.  It was completed in 1543 for Francis I of France, from models that had been prepared many years earlier for Cardinal Ippolito d'Este. 

The cellar is the only remaining work of precious metal which can be reliably attributed to Cellini. It was created in the Mannerist style of the late Renaissance and allegorically portrays Terra e Mare (Land and Sea). In Cellini's description, the sea was represented by a male figure reclining beside a ship for holding the salt; the earth he "fashioned like a woman" and placed a temple near her to serve as a receptacle for pepper. The salt cellar is made of ivory, rolled gold, and vitreous enamel.  The gold is not cast in a mould but hammered by hand into its delicate shape.  It stands about 26 cm tall.  The base is about 33.5 cm wide and features bearings to roll it around. 

It came into the possession of the Habsburgs as a gift by Charles IX of France to Archduke Ferdinand II of Tyrol, who had acted as a proxy for Charles in his wedding to Elisabeth of Austria. It was originally part of the Habsburg art collection at Castle Ambras, but was transferred to the Kunsthistorisches Museum in Vienna during the 19th century.

Theft and recovery
On 11 May 2003, the cellar was stolen from the Kunsthistorisches Museum, which was covered by scaffolding at that time due to reconstruction works. The thief set off the alarms, but these were ignored as false, and the theft remained undiscovered until 8:20 am.  The museum offered a reward of €1,000,000 for its recovery. The cellar was recovered on 21 January 2006, buried in a lead box in a forest near the town of Zwettl, Austria, about 90 km north of Vienna. The thief, Robert Mang, turned himself in after police released surveillance photos of the suspect which were subsequently recognized by acquaintances.

The sculpture is insured for an estimated $60 million (approx. $68.3 million in CPI-adjusted 2012 United States dollars) by Uniqa Insurance Group, an Austrian insurance company.

References

External links

Saliera at the Kunsthistorisches Museum's site

Sculptures by Benvenuto Cellini
Gold objects
Collections of the Kunsthistorisches Museum
1543 sculptures
Works in vitreous enamel
Stolen works of art
Edible salt